Minuscule 371 (in the Gregory-Aland numbering), ε 1003 (Soden), is a Greek minuscule manuscript of the New Testament, on parchment. Palaeographically it has been assigned to the 10th century. 
It contains marginalia.

Description 

The codex contains the text of the four Gospels on 315 parchment leaves. It is written in one column per page, in 20-21 lines per page.

There is also a division according to the Ammonian Sections (in Mark 233 Sections, the last section in 16:8), whose numbers are given at the margin, with references to the Eusebian Canons.

Text 

The Greek text of the codex is a representative of the Byzantine text-type. Hermann von Soden classified it to the textual family Kx. Aland placed it in Category V.
According to the Claremont Profile Method it belongs to the textual group 291 in Luke 1 (weak), Luke 10, and Luke 20.

History 

The manuscript was added to the list of New Testament manuscripts by Scholz (1794–1852). 
It was examined by Burgon. C. R. Gregory saw the manuscript in 1886.

The manuscript is currently housed at the Vatican Library (Vat. gr. 1159) in Rome.

See also 

 List of New Testament minuscules
 Biblical manuscript
 Textual criticism

References

Further reading 

 

Greek New Testament minuscules
10th-century biblical manuscripts
Manuscripts of the Vatican Library